Opened in 2003, the Nasher Sculpture Center is a museum in Dallas, Texas, that houses the Patsy and Raymond Nasher collection of modern and contemporary sculpture. It is located on a  site adjacent to the Dallas Museum of Art in the Dallas Arts District.

Founding 
Patsy and Raymond Nasher began collecting sculpture in the 1950s. Together they formed a comprehensive collection of masterpieces by Harry Bertoia, Constantin Brâncuși, Alexander Calder, Raymond Duchamp-Villon, Paul Gauguin, Willem de Kooning, Mark di Suvero, Alberto Giacometti, Barbara Hepworth, Ellsworth Kelly, Henri Matisse, Joan Miró, Henry Moore, Claes Oldenburg, Pablo Picasso, Auguste Rodin, Richard Serra, and David Smith, among others.

In 1997, Raymond Nasher acquired a plot of land in downtown Dallas across the street from the Dallas Museum of Art and hired architect Renzo Piano to design the Nasher Sculpture Center. The Nasher Foundation funded the entire $70 million cost of designing and constructing the museum, which includes indoor and outdoor galleries. The Sculpture Center opened in 2003 and features a regularly changing exhibition of works from the Raymond and Patsy Nasher Collection. By placing the facility on what was formerly part of the old Caruth family farm of circa 1850, Ray Nasher began the realization of the Arts District in Dallas, which has since been enhanced by the construction of the Winspear Opera House and the Wyly Theater.

Architecture and garden 
Renzo Piano, winner of the Pritzker Prize in 1998, is the architect of the Center's  building; he had been selected after Nasher met him at the opening of the Beyeler Foundation in Basel, Switzerland, in 1997. Piano has designed several critically acclaimed art museums; foremost among them are the Beyeler Museum in Basel, the Menil Collection in Houston, and Georges Pompidou Centre in Paris (in collaboration with Richard Rogers). He has been praised as an architect who has the genius to meld art, architecture, and advanced engineering to create some of the most remarkable museums in the world.

Piano worked in collaboration with landscape architect Peter Walker of PWP Landscape Architecture on the design of the  Garden. Walker has exerted a significant impact on the field of landscape architecture over a four-decade career. The scope of Walker's landscape projects is expansive and varied. It ranges from small gardens to new cities, corporate headquarters and academic campuses to urban plazas.

The building was constructed by The Beck Group, which also served as associate architect.

The facility opened in 2003 in a 55,000-square-foot building on a 2.4-acre site adjacent to the Dallas Museum of Art. Reflective glare of the nearby Museum Tower, constructed in 2012, comes in through the glass roof, putting portions of the collection at risk of damage. Artist James Turrell considered his work Tending (Blue) to be effectively destroyed by the tower's intrusion on its view, and the museum closed the artwork's chamber to the public at his request.

The museum has two levels: the ground level houses four galleries, institute offices, and a boardroom. The garden terraces downward to the auditorium, creating an open-air theater.

Program 
The Nasher Sculpture Center features rotating exhibitions drawn from the Nasher Collection as well as special exhibitions in its indoor and outdoor galleries. Among the major exhibitions organized by the Nasher are Matisse: Painter as Sculptor, the first Matisse sculpture retrospective in the U.S. in 20 years; Tony Cragg: Seeing Things, the first major U.S. museum exhibition of the artist in 20 years; and Variable States: Intention, Appearance, and Interpretation in Modern Sculpture, an exhibition and symposium on sculpture conservation organized in conjunction with the Getty. The Nasher Sculpture Center has also presented Jaume Plensa: Genus and Species; Alexander Calder and Contemporary Art: Form, Balance, Joy; and Ken Price Sculpture: A Retrospective.

Monthly events include Target First Saturdays for children and families, Til Midnight featuring Al Fresco dining, twilight strolls, bands and movies, and the NasherSalon series which welcomes distinguished speakers for an evening of discourse on art, architecture, and other cultural topics of interest. The Nasher Sculpture Center also participates in the Block Party Series together with the Dallas Museum of Art, the Crow Museum of Asian Art, and others in the Dallas Arts District.

360 Speaker Series: Artists, Critics, Curators 

 2016 Speakers
Ann Veronica Janssens / Piero Golia with Ann Goldstein / Mai-Thu Perret / Martha Thorne / Agents, Advisors, Devils and Apostates: A New Art World, Panel Discussion / Plaster: Medium and Process, Panel Discussion / Kathryn Andrews / Michael Dean / Rachel Rose
 2015 Speakers
Melvin Edwards /  Stories from the French Sculpture Census / Iván Navarro / Jonathan Hammer / Phyllida Barlow with Tyler Green / Philip Beesley / Giuseppe Penone / Alex Israel / Edmund de Waal
 2014 Speakers
Thomas Heatherwick / Anna-Bella Papp / Sarah Thorton / Tony Tasset / David Bates / Not Vital / Bettina Pousttchi / Mark Grotjahn / Tod Lippy / Liz Glynn
 2013 Speakers
Mark Dion / Ken Price Sculpture Panel / Heather Cook / Matthew Collings / Nathan Mabry / Liz Larner / Katharina Grosse / Lewis Kachur / Analia Saban / Return to Earth Symposium / Nasher XChange Panel / Make Art with Purpose Panel / Charles Long with Tyler Green
 2012 Speakers
Elliott Hundley / Tony Feher / Trenton Doyle Hancock / Erick Swenson / Ernesto Neto / Joseph Havel / The Art Guys / Kathryn Andrews / Lawrence Weiner / Catherine Craft / Eva Rothschild
 2011 Speakers
Charles Renfro / Jessica Holmes/ Alfredo Jaar / A Conversation on Statuesque / Charles Long / Aaron Curry and Thomas Houseago / Annette Lawrence / Heather Rowe / Tony Cragg / Diana Al-Hadid / Lawrence Weschler/ Dore Ashton with Michael Corris
 2010 Speakers
Michael Craig-Martin/ Adam Silverman and Nader Tehrani / William Jeffett / Allegra Pesenti / Linda Ridgway / Evan Holloway / Rick Lowe / Richard R. Brettell and Joachim Pissarro / Michael Corris / Antony Gormley  / Alexander Calder and Contemporary Art Panel

Exhibitions 
 Lynda Benglis: May 21, 2022 - September 18, 2022
 Magali Reus: A Sentence in Soil: May 14, 2022 - October 9, 2022
 Harry Bertoia: Sculpting Mid-Century Modern Life: January 29, 2022 – April 24, 2022
 Carol Bove: Collage Sculptures: October 16, 2021 – January 9, 2022
 Betye Saar: Call and Response: September 25, 2021 – January 2, 2022
 Guerrilla Girls: Takeover: May 12, 2021 – October 25, 2021
 Nasher Mixtape: February 6, 2021 – September 26, 2021
 Barry X Ball: Remaking Sculpture: January 25, 2020 – January 3, 2021
 Elmgreen & Dragset: Sculptures: September 14, 2019 – January 5, 2020
 Sheila Hicks: May 11, 2019 – August 18, 2019
 Sterling Ruby: Sculpture: February 2, 2019 – April 21, 2019
 The Nature of Arp: September 15, 2018 – January 6, 2019
 First Sculpture: Handaxe to Figure Stone: January 27, 2018 – April 28, 2018
 Tom Sachs: Tea Ceremony: September 16, 2017 – January 7, 2018
 Roni Horn: May 20, 2017 – August 20, 2017
 Richard Serra: Prints: January 28, 2017 – April 30, 2017
 Sightings: Michael Dean: October 22, 2016 – February 5, 2017
 Kathryn Andrews: Run for President: September 10, 2016 – January 8, 2017
 Joel Shapiro: May 7, 2016 – August 21, 2016
 Doris Salcedo: Plegaria Muda: February 27, 2016 – April 17, 2016
 Sightings: Mai-Thu Perret: March 12, 2016 – July 17, 2016
 Ann Veronica Janssens: January 23, 2016—April 17, 2016
 Sightings: Alex Israel: October 24, 2015 — January 31, 2016
 Piero Golia: Chalet Dallas: October 3, 2015 — February 7, 2016
 Giuseppe Penone: Being the River, Repeating the Forest: September 19, 2015—January 10, 2016
 Phyllida Barlow tryst: May 30, 2015—August 30, 2015
 Melvin Edwards: Five Decades: January 31, 2015 – May 10, 2015
 Sightings: Anna-Bella Papp: October 24, 2014 – January 18, 2015
 Provocations: The Architecture and Design of Heatherwick Studio: September 13, 2014 – January 4, 2015
 Mark Grotjahn Sculpture: May 31, 2014 – August 17, 2014
Sightings: Bettina Pousttchi: April 12, 2014 – August 17, 2014
David Bates: February 9, 2014 – May 11, 2014
 Return to Earth: September 21, 2013 – January 19, 2014
 Katharina Grosse: WUNDERBLOCK: June 1, 2013 – September 1, 2013
 Ken Price: A Retrospective: February 9, 2013 – May 12, 2013
 Rediscoveries: Modes of Making in Modern Sculpture: September 29, 2012 – January 13, 2013
 Sculpture in So Many Words: Text Pieces 1960–1980: September 29, 2012 – January 13, 2013
 Ernesto Neto: Cuddle on the Tightrope: May 12, 2012 – September 9, 2012
 Sightings: Eric Swenson: April 14, 2012 – September 9, 2012
 Sightings: Diana Al-Hadid: October 22, 2011 – January 15, 2012
 Elliot Hundley: The Bacchae: January 28, 2012 – April 22, 2012
 Tony Cragg: Seeing Things: September 10, 2011 – January 8, 2012
 Sightings: Martin Creed: March 26, 2011 – August 21, 2011
 Alexander Calder and Contemporary Art: Form, Balance, Joy: December 11, 2010 – March 6, 2011
 Sightings: Alyson Shotz: October 1, 2010 – January 2, 2011
 Revelation: The Art of James Magee: September 4 – November 28, 2010
 Rachel Whiteread Drawings: May 22 – August 15, 2010
 Jaume Plensa: Genus and Species: January 30 – May 2, 2010
 The Art of Architecture: Foster + Partners: September 26, 2009 – January 10, 2010
 George Segal: Street Scenes: January 24 – April 5, 2009
 In Pursuit of the Masters: Stories from the Raymond and Patsy Nasher Collection: September 20, 2008 – January 4, 2009
 Jacques Lipchitz: A Gift from the Artist's Estate: June 21 – September 7, 2008
 Beyond the Grasp: Sculpture Transcending the Physical: March 15 – August 31, 2008
 Woman: The Art of Gaston Lachaise: November 17, 2007 – February 17, 2008
 Matisse: Painter as Sculptor: January 21 – April 29, 2007
 On Tour with Renzo Piano Building Workshop: Selected Projects: May 13 – August 213, 2006
 The Women of Giacometti: January 14 – April 19, 2006
 David Smith: Drawing + Sculpting: April 16 – July 17, 2005
 Frank Stella: Painting in Three Dimensions: January 8 – April 3, 2005
 Bodies Past and Present: The Figurative Tradition in the Nasher Collection: September 18, 2004 – August 2005
 Variable States: Three Masterworks of Modern Sculpture: September 18, 2004 – January 2, 2005
 Medardo Rosso: Second Impressions: April 3 – June 20, 2004
 Picasso: The Cubist Portraits of Fernande Olivier: February 15 – May 9, 2004
 From Rodin to Calder: Masterworks of Modern Sculpture from the Nasher Collection: October 20, 2003 – August 22, 2004

Nasher XChange 

To celebrate its 10th anniversary, the Nasher Sculpture Center presented Nasher XChange from October 19, 2013 to February 16, 2014. Nasher Sculpture Center Director Jeremy Strick stated that Nasher XChange focused on public art, which engages the people and culture of Dallas. The Nasher XChange exhibition was made possible in part by an award from the National Endowment for the Arts, Art Works, and a grant from the Texas Commission on the Arts.
 Nasher XChange: Moore to the Point: October 19, 2013 – February 16, 2014
 Nasher XChange: CURTAINS: October 19, 2013 – February 16, 2014
 Nasher XChange: Buried House: October 19, 2013 – February 16, 2014
 Nasher XChange: X: October 19, 2013 – February 16, 2014
 Nasher XChange: Fountainhead: October 19, 2013 – February 16, 2014
 Nasher XChange: Trans.lation: October 19, 2013 – February 16, 2014
 Nasher XChange: Black & Blue: Cultural Oasis in the Hills: October 19, 2013 – February 16, 2014
 Nasher XChange: dear sunset: October 19, 2013 – February 16, 2014
 Nasher XChange: Flock in Space: October 19, 2013 – February 16, 2014
 Nasher XChange: Music (Everything I know I learned the day my son was born): October 19, 2013 – February 16, 2014
 Nasher XChange: Through the Eyes of Allison V. Smith: October 19, 2013 – February 16, 2014

Nasher Prize 
The Nasher Prize was established in April 2015. The award is dedicated exclusively to a living artist who has proven excellence in contemporary sculpture.

 (2016) – Doris Salcedo
Doris Salcedo was born in 1958 in Bogotá, Colombia, her current residence. Salcedo has created sculptures and installations that transform familiar, everyday objects into moving and powerful testimonies of loss and remembrance.
 (2017) – Pierre Huyghe
Huyghe was born in 1962 in Paris, he lives and works in Chile and New York. Huyghe has profoundly expanded the parameters of sculpture through artworks encompassing a variety of materials and disciplines, bringing music, cinema, and dance into contact with biology and philosophy and incorporating time-based elements as diverse as fog, ice, parades, rituals, automata, computer programs, games, dogs, bees, and microorganisms.
 (2018) – Theaster Gates
Gates was born in 1973 in Chicago, Illinois, where he continues to live and work as a professor at the University of Chicago. His work explores the material aspects of memory, history, and place.
 (2019) – Isa Genzken
Genzken was born in 1948 in Germany. Genzken has continually reinvented the language of sculpture by creating objects inspired by popular culture and historical events that explore the complexities of contemporary realism.
 (2020–2021) – Michael Rakowitz
Rakowitz was born in 1973 in Long Island, New York. He is Iraqi-American and much of his work explores his identity as an American artist of Iraqi Jewish descent. His work explores the complex history between the US and Middle East, as well as cultural heritage and humanitarian crisis.
 (2022) – Nairy Baghramian
Baghramian, born 1971, is an Iranian-born German visual artist. Baghramian takes the creation and presentation of sculpture as her de facto subject yet makes works highlighting the poignant, contradictory, and sometimes humorous circumstances that can suffuse both the artistic process as well as everyday life.  Over the past three decades, she has explored elements of sculptural practice and installation to create works that challenge their settings and upend expected modes of presentation as well as the architectural, sociological, political, and historical contexts that inform them.
 (2023) – Senga Nengudi
Nengudi was born in 1943 in Chicago and is known for works exploring the body, as well as for combining sculpture and performance. Nengudi rose to prominence among the Black avant-garde of the 1970s and 80s.

Key people

Nasher Sculpture Center Board of Trustees 

Mr. David Haemisegger, President
Mr. Stephen Stamas, Chairman
Mr. Elliot Cattarulla
Ms. Nancy Nasher Haemisegger
Mr. John G. Heimann
Dr. William Jordan
Dr. Steven A. Nash
Ms. Andrea Nasher
Mr. Jeremy Strick

The Director 

Jeremy Strick, Director
Jeremy Strick has been the Director of the Nasher Sculpture Center since March 2009. Mr. Strick oversees collections, exhibitions, and operations at the 2.4 acre museum located in the heart of downtown Dallas’ Arts District.

Curators 

Jed Morse, Chief Curator
Catherine Craft, Curator
Leigh Arnold, Assistant Curator

Nancy A. Nasher and David J. Haemisegger 

David J. Haemisegger and Nancy A. Nasher serve on the Board of Directors of the Nasher Sculpture Center, a museum founded in 2003 by Nancy's father, Raymond D. Nasher, which houses the Raymond D. and Patsy R. Nasher Collection of Modern and Contemporary Sculpture. Nancy worked closely with her father on the creation and development of the Sculpture Center. David currently serves as President of the Nasher Sculpture Center, and is on the Finance and Audit Committees. David and Nancy serve on the Nasher Foundation Board.

See also 
List of buildings and structures in Dallas, Texas

References

External links 

 
 ArchitectureWeek: article about the Nasher Sculpture Center design

Landmarks in Dallas
Sculpture gardens, trails and parks in the United States
Art museums and galleries in Texas
Museums in Dallas
Downtown Dallas
Renzo Piano buildings
Arts in Dallas
Art museums established in 2003
2003 establishments in Texas